The Hawaii Project is a personalized book discovery engine. The Hawaii Project provides personalized book recommendations and access to current book news. It tracks curated sources of interesting books and articles, uncovering new texts that align with a user's interests, their favorite authors and current events. The Hawaii Project also provides a social reading app called Bookship, shortlisted for the 2017 Bookseller's Startup of the Year.  Users of The Hawaii Project can follow authors and particular sources of writing about books to get alerts about relevant information. It is privately funded.

Company history
The Hawaii Project was founded in 2014 by Mark Watkins. Prior to The Hawaii Project, he was CEO and co-founder of Goby (search engine), a mobile recommendation engine for finding things to do, since acquired by Telenav. Prior to that, he was VP of Engineering for Endeca, a search company acquired by Oracle Corporation for $1.075B.

The origin of the company was rooted in the founder's frustration at not finding out about new books from his favorite authors.

See also
Goodreads
LibraryThing

References

External links
Official Website

American book websites
American companies established in 2014